Bruno Ewald Steinhoff (born November 1937) is a German billionaire businessman, the founder of Steinhoff International, a South African-based international retail holding company, and its executive chairman until September 2008. He is now a non-executive director, and a member of the supervisory board.

Early life
Bruno Steinhoff was born in November 1937.

Career
Steinhoff started his career in furniture in 1964 in Westerstede, Germany. He started by sourcing furniture from Eastern Europe and selling it in Western Europe, and began manufacturing in 1989.

Steinhoff International is Europe's second largest furniture retailer, after Ikea.

Personal life
Steinhoff lives in Johannesburg, South Africa.

His daughter Angela Krüger-Steinhoff is a member of the supervisory board of Steinhoff International.

References

1937 births
Living people
German expatriates in South Africa
German company founders
20th-century German businesspeople
German billionaires
South African billionaires